Pulled Apart by Horses are an English alternative rock band from Leeds. They formed in early 2008.

The band were signed by Transgressive Records in 2009, and released their debut self-titled album Pulled Apart by Horses on 21 June 2010. In August 2011, they went into Monnow Valley Studio in Wales to record with record producer Gil Norton, and their second album Tough Love was released to critical acclaim on 20 January 2012.

After Tough Love, the band sold out their first European tour, and went on to support Biffy Clyro and Foals. In 2010 they supported Muse at the Old Trafford Cricket Ground.

In September 2014 the band's third album Blood became their first top 40, entering the UK Albums Chart at number 38. In 2016, Pulled Apart by Horses recorded a take over for Annie Mac and the BBC's Radio 1 in the United Kingdom.

The band's fourth album, The Haze was released in March 2017 and reached number 12 in the UK Albums Chart.

History

Formation (2008) 
Pulled Apart By Horses formed after Lee Vincent (Concentration Champ) was contacted by James Brown over a music forum. He was looking to start a The Jesus Lizard style band in Leeds. They went on to rehearse as a three piece with Robert Lee being invited to play Bass at a practice studio on the outskirts of Leeds city centre. Lead singer Tom Hudson's old band Mother Vulpine (in which he played bass) broke up and after the other three members completed a few rehearsals they then invited Tom Hudson to provide vocals and they then began writing as a 4-piece.

It is believed no material was recorded as the band performing as a 3-piece. After their formation in early 2008, the band regularly rehearsed above 'The Packhorse' pub in Leeds which was also where they performed their first secret show to a full house of attendees who had been invited by text message at the Packhorse in Leeds on 12 February 2008.

The band then began touring in 2008 and soon received notable attention from the press and media due to their live performances and soon began to gain a quickly growing fan base. They also began to be known for their very frantic live performances during which band members have been known to be injured. On 17 May 2008, when headlining Nastyfest IX in Leeds to a packed audience, a chaotic and injury stricken performance took place leading to guitarist James Brown being sent to hospital with a gash to the head.

The band's debut single, "Meat Balloon", was released via Big Scary Monsters Recording Company in October 2008. It debuted at No. 18 on the UK Indie Singles chart. The limited edition 7" single came with a free CD and comic, created by the band's singer, Tom Hudson.

Pulled Apart by Horses (2009–2011)
In January 2009, PABH released their single "I Punched A Lion In The Throat" on Too Pure/Beggars on 7" vinyl, with b-side "The Crapsons". The song was also made available as a free download on the band's official website. That year, the band went on to constantly tour for one year before the release of the debut album playing larger shows supporting Blood Red Shoes, Future of the Left, The Bronx, Rolo Tomassi, Glassjaw and Anti Flag.

Once the band became busy with frequent touring in the UK and Europe they self-released 500 copies a 5 track CD which was only available at shows whilst they were securing a record deal. A second run off 500 were made in early 2010 prior to their debut record release. That year also saw the release of the first record and the band headlining two full UK and European tours and more supporting tours with the likes of Biffy Clyro and Foals, and then in 2010 supported Muse at Manchester County Cricket Ground. On 21 March, Transgressive Records announced the release of a strictly limited 12" vinyl release titled 'Live At Leeds' to be released on Record Store Day (17 April) in the UK. The record would appear to borrow the idea from The Who classic album with artwork and packaging being similar. The 'Live at Leeds' album is available to download from the band's official website.

Tough Love, Blood and The Haze (2012–present)
When the second record Tough Love was released in 2011 the band then went out to play a headline tour in the UK and Europe to support the record from February to April which included a sold-out show in London at the Electric Ballroom. Later in 2012 the band announced a full UK tour for November which was then announced as being pulled from the band's website due to 'unforeseen circumstances'  but it is believed the band was concentrating on their third record.

In October 2021, the band signed with Alcopop! Records, who will release their fifth album in Spring 2022.

Band members
 Tom Hudson – lead vocals, rhythm guitar (2008–present)
 Robert John Lee – bass guitar, backing vocals (2008–present)
 Tommy Davison – drums, percussion (2014–present)

Past members
 James Brown – lead guitar (2008–2022)
 Lee Vincent – drums, percussion (2008–2014)

Discography

Studio albums

Singles

Compilation appearances
On The Bone Vol.2 (2008) (On The Bone Records)

EPs
Tour Traxx (2009)
Live At Leeds 12" Vinyl (2010)

Split singles
Pulled Apart By Horses/Holy State (2009)
DTTR 4x12" Vol 1 (2009)
Pulled Apart By Horses/Blood Red Shoes (2013)

Music videos
 "Meat Balloon" (2009)
 "Back to the Fuck Yeah" (2010)
 "High Five, Swan Dive, Nose Dive" (2010)
 "Yeah Buddy" (2010)
 "I Punched a Lion in the Throat" (2011)
 "V.E.N.O.M." (2011)
 "Wolf Hand" (2012)
 "Bromance Ain't Dead" (2012)
 "Epic Myth" (2012)
 "Hot Squash" (2014)
 "Lizard Baby" (2014)
 "Medium Rare" (2014)
 "Grim Deal" (2015)
 "The Big What If" (2016)
 "Hotel Motivation" (2016)
"Is This Thing On?" (2019)

References

External links
Pulled Apart by Horses official web site
Last.Fm Page

Underground punk scene in the United Kingdom
Indie rock groups from Leeds
Punk rock groups from West Yorkshire
English stoner rock musical groups